LMU may refer to:
 ICAO designator for AlMasria Universal Airlines, an Egyptian airline
 Lambung Mangkurat University
 Latin Monetary Union
 Leeds Metropolitan University
 Liaoning Medical University
 Lincoln Memorial University
 London Metropolitan University
 Loyola Marymount University
 Ludwig Maximilian University of Munich
LMU, an abbreviation for Late Middle Ukrainian, a period of the Ukrainian language in the mid and late 18th century